In political science, political economics, and peace and conflict studies, referring to the military–industrial complex, the peace–industrial complex defines the industry and economy derived from development, peacemaking, peacebuilding, and conflict resolution at both the domestic and foreign levels. While some scholars (Seiberling 1972) argue that the peace–industrial complex must oppose the military-industrial complex, others (Aberkane 2012) argue it is destined to become its natural, peaceful evolution, and further call it the "military-industrial complex 2.0". The latter argue the peace-industrial complex more precisely consists of turning military research and development into civilian technology as systematically as possible. Although it has been discussed in more recent times the concept was introduced as early as in 1969 by the U.S. Senate Committee on Government Operations.

In relation to the War Against War

Origin of the Peace-industrial complex 
At least two approaches to the War Against War may be distinguished, the frontal opposition to war or Anti-war movement on the one side and the transcendent, post-war conception of William James' 'Moral Equivalent of war' positing, in the way of the UNESCO, that the only way to end conflicts is to make Humanity busy with more fascinating endeavors than wars. In his Nobel acceptance speech Martin Luther King Jr. further underlined that idea which would become the basis of the transcendentist school (e.g. Aberkane):

Various scholars (Suter 1986, Aberkane 2012, Roberts 2009) and politicians (Seiberling 1972) have thus advocated that peace profiteering should simply be made palatably larger than any possible war profiteering, thus transcending the war against war. However, the first generations of Peace-Industrial scholars have advocated frontal opposition to the military-industrial complex rather than its transcendent, voluntary metamorphosis into a globally benevolent yet very profitable peace-industrial complex.

In 1986 Keith D. Suter defended his Ph.D dissertation on Creating the political will necessary for achieving multilateral disarmament : the need for a peace-industrial complex, which was further cited in 1995. The concept of a Peace–industrial complex had already been introduced as early as in 1969 in the U.S. Senate Committee on Government Operations. The original quote affirmed direct opposition to the military-industrial complex and was therefore not transcendent in nature: "It is time for the United States to break the Huge military-industrial complex and begin in its stead a people and peace-industrial complex". It received further citation throughout the 1970s. The notion appeared in the 'United States Congress House Committee on Science and Astronautics, Subcommittee on Science, Research, and Development' in 1972  in a congressional address by US Rep. J.F. Seiberling (1972)

Suter further defended that "each country create a national Ministry for Peace", which was contemporary to the creation of the Ministry for Peace Australia (MFPA) initiative and the Global Alliance for Ministries & Infrastructures for Peace (GAMIP). An Education for a Peace Industrial Complex conference (EPIC) is also mentioned in a 1984 issue of the Nuclear Times.

The Transcendentist school 
If Kofi J. Roberts explicitly called for the substitution of a military-industrial complex by a peace industrial complex which would enable the focusing of federal spendings on construction rather than destruction, Idriss J. Aberkane further defended the transcendent approach to the peace-industrial complex by calling it the "military-industrial complex 2.0" and thus neither the enemy nor the political complement to the military industrial complex but rather its natural, inevitable evolution on the account that investors (either institutional or private) will inevitably realize the larger profitability of construction over destruction. Aberkane also advocates the political viability of a peace-industrial complex by declaring that in the 21st century, what he calls "weapons of mass construction" will grant much larger political leverage, leadership and soft power than weapons of mass destruction.

See also
 List of industrial complexes

References 

Peace and conflict studies
Political science
Industrial complexes